Maxine Dexter (born December 5, 1972) is an American physician and politician serving as a member of the Oregon House of Representatives. She was appointed in June 2020 after the death of Mitch Greenlick. She represents the 33rd district, which covers the Northwest District and Northwest Heights of Portland, as well as Cedar Mill, Oak Hills, and most of Bethany.

Early life and education
Dexter grew up in Bothell, Washington. She received her bachelor's degree in political science and communication from the University of Washington, and her MD from that university's School of Medicine.

Career 
Dexter served her medical residency in Aurora, Colorado, and moved to Portland with her husband in 2008. She works as a pulmonologist with Kaiser Permanente in Hillsboro.

Dexter said she was inspired to run for office following the Brett Kavanaugh Supreme Court confirmation hearing, during which Christine Blasey Ford accused Kavanaugh of sexual assault. She won the Democratic primary to succeed Greenlick on May 17, 2020 with 40% of the vote, defeating three other candidates, including Christina Stephenson. Greenlick died on May 15, so Dexter was appointed to finish out his term a month later.

During the COVID-19 pandemic, Dexter treated patients with the disease, and wrote a letter urging Governor Kate Brown to close Oregon schools in April 2020.

Political positions
Dexter supports the transition to a single-payer health care system. She also supports greater protections for workers, reducing greenhouse gas emissions, increased money for public housing, and stricter gun control.

References

External links
 Campaign website
 Legislative website
 Medical website

1972 births
Living people
Democratic Party members of the Oregon House of Representatives
American pulmonologists
Physicians from Portland, Oregon
Politicians from Portland, Oregon
21st-century American politicians
21st-century American women politicians
Women state legislators in Oregon
University of Washington alumni
University of Washington School of Medicine alumni
People from Bothell, Washington